A breast-shaped hill is a hill in the shape of a breast. Some such hills are named "Pap", an archaic word for the breast or nipple of a woman. Such anthropomorphic geographic features are to be found in different places of the world and in some cultures they were revered as the attributes of the Mother Goddess, such as the Paps of Anu, named after Anu, an important female deity of pre-Christian Ireland.

Overview

The name Mamucium that gave origin to the name of the city of Manchester is thought to derive from the Celtic language meaning "breast-shaped hill", referring to the sandstone bluff on which the fort stood; this later evolved into the name Manchester.

Breast-shaped hills are often connected with local ancestral veneration of the breast as a symbol of fertility and  well-being. It is not uncommon for very old archaeological sites to be located in or below such hills, as on Samson, Isles of Scilly, where there are large ancient burial grounds both on the North Hill and South Hill, or Burrén and Burrena, Aragon, Spain, where two Iron Age Urnfield culture archaeological sites lie beneath the hills.

Many of the myths surrounding these mountains are ancient and enduring and some have been recorded in the oral literature or written texts; for example, in an unspecified location in Asia, there was a mountain known as "Breast Mountain" with a cave in which the Buddhist monk Bodhidharma (Da Mo) spent a long time in meditation.

Travelers and cartographers in colonial times often changed the ancestral names of such hills.
The mountain known to the Indigenous Australian people as Didhol or Dithol (Woman's Breast) was renamed Pigeon House Mountain by Captain James Cook at the time of his exploration of Australia's eastern coast in 1770. 

Mamelon (from French "nipple") is a French name for a breast-shaped hillock.
Fort Mamelon was a famous hillock fortified by the Russians and captured by the French as part of the Siege of Sevastopol during the Crimean War of the 1850s.
The word mamelon is also used in volcanology to describe a particular rock formation of volcanic origin.
The term was coined by the French explorer and naturalist Jean Baptiste Bory de Saint-Vincent.

Africa

African Great Lakes
Mount Elgon on the Uganda-Kenya border
Sweet Sixteen, Matthews Range (Ldoinyo Lenkiyio), Laikipia district, Rift Valley Province, northern Kenya.

Horn of Africa
Naasa Hablood in Somaliland

Indian Ocean
Trois Mamelles mountains in the west of Mauritius
Mamelles Island, Seychelles

Southern Africa
Omatako Mountain south-west of Otjiwarongo in Namibia
Sheba's Breasts, Eswatini; these formations inspired British writer H. Rider Haggard, who included them in his novel King Solomon's Mines.
Three Sisters in the Northern Cape, South Africa
West Africa
Deux Mamelles, Pointe des Almadies, Cap-Vert, Senegal

Antarctica
Una Peaks, long known as Una's Tits colloquially, at the entrance to the Lemaire Channel, Graham Land
Nipple Peak, Palmer Archipelago, Graham Land
Hemus Peak, Livingston Island, South Shetland Islands

Asia

Cambodia
Sroh-Plom Mountain, "Virtuous Woman's Breast Mountain", located close to Senmonorom, Senmonorom District, Mondulkiri Province, Cambodia.

China

 Dazeshan Mountain in  Shandong Province
 Wuyi Mountain in Fujian Province
 Twin Breasts Peak in Tianzhu Mountain in Anhui Province
 Qianling Mausoleum near Xian, their shape is man-made
 Two Breast Peaks:
two mountains in Zhenfeng County, Guizhou Province
two peaks of Golden Needle Mountain in Taimali Township, Taitung County, Taiwan
Rushan (meaning "Breast Mountain") is a mountain in Weihai, Shandong Province, China.

Middle East
Tell Sader al-Arus (translation from Arabic: "Breast of the bride") is a mountain in the Golan Heights.

Philippines

Chocolate Hills, more than a thousand unusual geological formations in Bohol. A popular tourist destination named for their brown colour in the summer.
Ilihan Hill, "Watery Breast", a pilgrimage site about four kilometres from Jagna, Bohol
Kagmasuso, among other breast-shaped hills in San Andrés,  Catanduanes
Mount Susong Dalaga (literally "Maiden's Breasts Mountain") is the name of several peaks in the Philippines, including:
Mount Susong Dalaga, Abra de Ilog, Occidental Mindoro
Mount Susong Dalaga (also known as Breast Peak) in Tampakan, South Cotabato
Susong Dalaga Peak of Mount Batolusong, Tanay, Rizal
Manabu Peak (also known as Mount Dalaga or Mount Susong Dalaga) of the Malepunyo Mountain Range in between the provinces of Batangas, Laguna, and Quezon
Mt. Tagapo (also known as Mount Susong Dalaga), Talim Island, two huge conical hills that are the highest peaks of Talim Island. 
Musuan Peak, an active volcano in Maramag, Bukidnon

Thailand
Doi Phu Nom (ดอยภูนม), Phayao Province, a breast-shaped hill rising in an area of grassland of the Phi Pan Nam Range.
 Khao Nom (เขานม), was one of the former names of Khanom, a district of Nakhon Si Thammarat Province, due to the surrounding mountains.
 Khao Nom Nang, a hill at Huai Krachao, Kanchanaburi. 
 Khao Nom Nang, (เขานมนาง), a hill north of Pak Phraek, Kanchanaburi. 
 Khao Nom Nang, a hill between Nong Pet and Chong Sadao, Kanchanaburi. 
 Khao Nom Nang, an isolated hill in Khok Samae San, Lopburi. 
 Khao Nom Nang, an isolated large hill in Khao Kala, Nakhon Sawan Province. 
 Khao Nom Nang, the name of two hills west of Doeng Bang Nam Buat, Suphan Buri. 
Khao Nom Sao (เขานมสาว), "female breast mountain", a mountain located in Ranong Province, Thailand.
 Khao Nom Sao, a round hill east of Phet Kasem road in Prachuap Khiri Khan Province. 
 Khao Nom Sao, a mountain in Chumphon Province. 
 Khao Nom Sao, a hill in Phang Nga Province, part of a greater mountain system. 
 Khao Nom Wang (เขานมวังก), a small hill just east of the main road at Phanom Wang, Khuan Khanun District, also known as Khao Phanom Wang, Phatthalung Province. 
Ko Nom Sao (lit. female breast island) are twin islands located in the Phang Nga Bay, Phang Nga Province, Thailand.
Ko Nom Sao in Khao Sam Roi Yot National Park, Prachuap Khiri Khan Province. 
Ko Nom Sao, an island off the shore in Chanthaburi Province.

Europe

UK and Ireland
Mumbles, the two islands (on one of which stands a lighthouse) off the southeast corner of the Gower peninsula, Swansea, Wales
Beinn Chìochan in the Grampians, Scotland
Bennachie in Aberdeenshire, Scotland
North Berwick Law In East Lothian, Scotland
Mam Barisdale in Knoydart, Scotland
Mynydd Llanwenarth near Abergavenny, Wales
Mount Keen in Aberdeenshire / Angus, Scotland
Northala Fields in London, England. Technically 4 hills, and artificial, but clearly resembling two "grassy boobs" from the A40
A' Chioch in Ben More, Isle of Mull, Scotland
Mam Sodhail, on the northern side of Glen Affric, some 30 kilometres east of Kyle of Lochalsh
Mam Tor, near Castleton in the High Peak of Derbyshire, England.
Samson, Isles of Scilly
Twmbarlwm near Risca, Wales
Wittenham Clumps in Oxfordshire
Shutlingsloe, Cheshire
Paps or Maiden Paps are rounded, breastlike hills located mostly in Scotland:
Paps of Anu, near Killarney, Ireland
Paps of Fife in Scotland
Paps of Jura, on the western side of the island of Jura, in the Inner Hebrides, Scotland
Paps of Lothian in Scotland
Maiden Paps, twin hills in Caithness, Scotland
Maiden Paps, twin hills in the Kilpatrick Hills, Scotland
Maiden Paps, twin hills south of Hawick in the Scottish Borders, Scotland
Maiden Paps, another name for the Tunstall Hills near Sunderland, Tyne and Wear, England
Maiden's Pap, another name for Schiehallion, Perth and Kinross, Scotland
Pap of Glencoe in the Scottish Highlands

Denmark
Marens Patter (Maren's Tits), a pair of twin hills that has functioned as a landmark for seafarers since the Bronze Ages.

Germany
Lilienstein in Saxon Switzerland, Germany
Greece
Breasts of Aphrodite in Mykonos, Greece

Iceland
Vatnsdalshólar

Slovenia
Šmarna gora or Mount Saint Mary north of Ljubljana

Spain
Tetica de Bacares or "La Tetica", a 2,086 m (6,488 ft) high mountain in the Sierra de Los Filabres, Spain.
, commonly known as Tetas de Lierganes, in Cantabria
Tetas de Viana, La Alcarria, Guadalajara Province
Puig de Mamelles, Felanitx, Mallorca
Ses Mamelles, another name for the 714 m (2343 ft) high Puig des Castellot, Escorca, Mallorca
Turó de la Mamella, a mountain near Vacarisses, Catalonia
Burrén and Burrena near Fréscano, Aragon

North and Central America

Canada
Anû Kathâ Îpa in the Canadian Rockies of Alberta

El Salvador
San Vicente, also known as Chichontepec, the mountain of the two breasts in Nahuat, a stratovolcano in El Salvador

Guadeloupe
Mamelles, Guadeloupe

Haiti
Morne Deux Mamelles, Haiti

Mexico
Las Tetas de Juana, San Pedro Municipality, Coahuila
Tres Tetas Mountain or El Chichión in Costa Grande of Guerrero

Nicaragua
Ometepe, in Lake Nicaragua. Legend says that the island's volcanoes Maderas and Concepción formed from the breasts of Ometepetl, a daughter of the Niquirano tribe.

Panamá
Cerro La Teta in Las Guabas

Puerto Rico
Cerro Las Tetas in Salinas, Puerto Rico
Tetas de Cerro Gordo in San Germán, Puerto Rico

United States
 Bubble Mountains, in Acadia National Park of Maine.
Isanaklesh Peaks, in Maricopa County, Arizona, formerly known as Squaw Tits.
Nippletop, in the Adirondack High Peaks of New York. During the later 19th century, it was euphemistically renamed "Dial Mountain", a name now officially applied to another nearby peak.
Pilot Mountain, Pilot Mountain, North Carolina. Referenced many times on the Andy Griffith Show as Mt. Pilot. Andy spoke about a wonderful place to travel called "Pilot" by the locals.
Pinnacle Mountain, Arkansas, near Maumelle. During the colonial and early American periods, the mountain was known as "Mamelle" mountain. "Mamelle" is a name commonly applied in the French-speaking parts of the world to a breast.
Rock Mary, Caddo County, Oklahoma.
Spanish Peaks, Colorado, named Huajatolla by the Ute Indians, meaning "two breasts".
Tetilla Peak, Caja del Rio, New Mexico.  "Tetilla" is Spanish for "nipple".
Teton Range. French-Canadian trappers named the Teton Mountains around 1820. The distinctive peaks appeared as Les Trois Tétons (The Three Breasts) as seen from the north;
Grand Teton,
Middle Teton,
South Teton.
Twin Peaks, in San Francisco, California. When the Spanish conquistadors and settlers arrived at the beginning of the 18th century, they called the area "Los Pechos de la Chola" or "Breasts of the Indian Maiden" and devoted the area to ranching. When San Francisco passed under American control during the 19th Century, it was renamed "Twin Peaks".
Maggie's Peaks, just west of Lake Tahoe, California.
Uncanoonuc Mountains, Goffstown, New Hampshire.  From a Native American word for a woman's breasts.
Mollie's Nipple or Molly's Nipple is the name given to as many as seven peaks and some other geological features in Utah.
Tunas Peak located in Pecos County, Texas west of Bakersfield.
Betsy Bell and Mary Gray, two adjacent hills in Staunton, Virginia.

Oceania

Australia
Pigeon House Mountain, New South Wales, Australia
Black Mountain (Australian Capital Territory) and Mount Ainslie, the space between being known as Canberra, meaning cleavage between the two 'breasts' of those mountains.
Mammaloid Hills, Victoria, Australia
New Zealand
Saddle Hill, Dunedin, New Zealand
Harbour Cone, Dunedin, New Zealand

South America
Argentina
Cerro Tres Tetas, in Santa Cruz
Cerro Teta in Neuquén.
Ñuñorco Grande, in Tucumán.
Los Nonos, in Nono, Córdoba.

Bolivia
Cerro Tres Tetas in Potosí, Bolivia

Chile
Sierra Teta, Futaleufú, Chile
Tetas del Biobío, formed by Cerro Teta Norte and Cerro Teta Sur, located in the mouth of the Biobío River, Chile.

Colombia
Cerro La Teta, La Guajira
Morro La Teta, El Carmen de Viboral, Antioquia
Pico Tetari, Serranía del Perijá, La Guajira

Cuba
Tetas de Santa Teresa, Baracoa, Cuba

French Guiana
Les Mamelles Islets, French Guiana

Peru
Cerro Tetas, Chiclayo Province, Peru

Uruguay
Cerro Batoví, in Tacuarembó. Batoví means breast of a virgin in the Guaraní language.
Cerro Pan de Azúcar (Sugarloaf Hill), in the Maldonado Department

Venezuela
Tetas de María Guevara, Isla Margarita, Venezuela
Teta de Niquitao, Trujillo State, Venezuela
Cerro de Las Tetas, Tinaquillo, Cojedes, Venezuela
Cerro las Tres Tetas, Barquisimeto, Venezuela

Gallery

See also
Maiden Paps (disambiguation)
Mamelon (fort)
Mamelon (volcanology)
Mamucium
Monadnock
Mountains and hills of Scotland
Phallic Rock, a rock in Arizona, United States
St Melangell's Church, Pennant Melangell
The Sleeping Lady

References

External links
Stuart McHardy, The Goddess in the Landscape of Scotland
The Gododdin triangle by Philip Coppens
Yakima Herald-Republic - State Changes Name of Hill (Squaw Tit) to Pushtay
Mark Monmonier, From Squaw Tit to Whorehouse Meadow: How Maps Name, Claim, and Inflame

Ethnography
Vernacular geography
Lists of mountains